Waxwings, Cherry Blossoms, and Bamboo is a 17th century painting / scroll painting by Kiyohara Yukinobu. It is in the collection of the Metropolitan Museum of Art.

Description and interpretation 
This Edo period (1615–1868) hanging scroll painting depicts bird, flower, Bamboo, cherry blossom. Waxwings were a symbol of marital harmony and familial prosperity. The full bloom of the cherry tree indicates late spring.

References 

Created via preloaddraft
Metropolitan Museum of Art 2021 drafts
Paintings in the collection of the Metropolitan Museum of Art
Paintings by Kiyohara Yukinobu